Romancheinidae is a family of bryozoans belonging to the order Cheilostomatida.

Genera

Genera:
 Allerescha Gordon, 1989
 Antarcticaetos Hayward & Thorpe, 1988
 Arctonula Gordon & Grischenko, 1994

References

Cheilostomatida